The Ligue Nord-Américaine de Hockey (LNAH, "North American Hockey League")  is a low-level professional ice hockey league based in the Canadian province of Quebec. Teams in the LNAH compete for the Vertdure Cup.

History
The league was founded as the Quebec Semi-Pro Hockey League (QSPHL; French: Ligue de hockey semi-professionnelle du Québec (LHSPQ)) in 1996, and became fully professional and assumed its current name in 2004. It reached its peak in terms of number of teams that season, with ten.

Due to the COVID-19 pandemic, the 2019-20 playoffs were suspended and never concluded; Thetford Assurancia was the regular season champion. The league had hoped to start the 2021 season in January, but announced in November 2020 that it would not be going forward with one, although it floated the possibility of a spring tournament should the situation improve.

League play
Unlike higher-level minor professional leagues, such as the American Hockey League or the ECHL, the LNAH is not known for its skill level. Its teams employ many enforcers and has a rather infamous reputation for on-ice antics, primarily fisticuffs. The LNAH has a reputation as the world's toughest hockey league; a New York Times article stated that the league averaged 3.2 fights a game during the 2010–11 season, compared with 0.6 fights in the National Hockey League.

Despite this reputation, many of the players have been ex-National Hockey League or ex-American Hockey League players, including Patrick Côté, Michel Picard, Stéphane Richer, Bobby Dollas, Guillaume Lefebvre, Garrett Burnett, Daniel Shank, François Leroux, Jeremy Stevenson, Éric Fichaud, Mario Roberge, David Gosselin, Michel Ouellet, Jesse Bélanger, Donald Brashear, Yves Racine, Anthony Stewart and Juraj Kolník. During the 2004–05 NHL lockout, some NHL players -- such as Sylvain Blouin, Donald Brashear, Sébastien Caron, Mathieu Biron, Marc-André Bergeron and Sébastien Charpentier -- played the entire season in the LNAH. This is abetted by the absence of a veteran limit rule (common to other minor pro leagues in North America) which allows teams to stock up on experienced players. 

The 15-round LNAH Draft is held during the summer. Players too old for junior ice hockey may be drafted even if they were already drafted by an NHL team. The league has had a rule that stipulates that all players must either have come from or played junior hockey in Quebec, though it has not been strictly used for LNAH teams based outside Quebec.

Teams

Current

 Notes

 An asterisk (*) denotes a franchise move. See the respective team articles for more information.

Timeline

Defunct

Acton Vale Beaulieu (2000–01; became Saint-Hyacinthe Cousin)
Acton Vale Nova (1996–2000; renamed Acton Vale Beaulieu)
Asbestos Aztèques (1997–2001; renamed Asbestos Dubé)
Asbestos Aztèques (2002–03; folded)
Asbestos Dubé (2001–02; renamed Asbestos Aztèques)
Berlin BlackJacks (2018; team taken over by league after 10 games in New Hampshire and moved to St-Jérôme, Quebec for the remainder of the 2018-19 season as Les Pétrôliers du Nord, and then to Laval, Quebec for season 2019-20 under the same name)
Cornwall River Kings (2012–16; folded)
Côte-de-Beaupré As (2000–01; became Québec As and played at Charlesbourg in 2001–2002 and at Beauport in 2002–2003)
Côte-de-Beaupré Caron et Guay (1999–2000; became Côte-de-Beaupré As)
Granby Blitz (1997–2002; renamed Granby Prédateurs)
Granby Prédateurs (2002–04; folded)
Haut-Richelieu Dragons (1996–97; renamed Iberville Dragons)
Iberville Dragons (1997–98; became Saint-Laurent Dragons)
Joliette Blizzard (1998–2000; renamed Joliette Mission)
Joliette Mission (2000–02; became Saint-Jean-sur-Richelieu Mission)
Jonquière Condors (1997–2002; renamed Saguenay Paramédic)
Lachute Rapides (1996–99; became LaSalle Rapides)
LaSalle Rapides (1999–2003; folded)
Laurentides Gladiateurs (1996–97; became Sainte-Thérèse Chiefs)
Laval Chiefs (1998–2005; renamed Laval Summum-Chiefs)
Laval Summum-Chiefs (2005–06; became Saint-Jean-sur-Richelieu Summum-Chiefs)
Laval Braves (2013–14; renamed Laval Predateurs)
Laval Predators (2014–17; folded)
Louiseville Jets (1996–97; folded)
Pont-Rouge Caron et Guay (2001–04; became Trois-Rivières Caron et Guay)
Pont-Rouge Grand Portneuf (1996–2001; renamed Pont-Rouge Caron et Guay)
Québec As (1997–98; dormant in 1998–99 and became Côte-de-Beaupré Caron et Guay)
Québec As (2001–03; renamed Québec Radio X, then Pont-Rouge Lois Jeans)
Rive-Sud Chacals (1996–98; became Saint-Georges Garaga)
Rivière-du-Loup Promutuel (2001–04; folded)
Rivière-du-Loup CIMT (2008–10; renamed Rivière-du-Loup 3L
Saguenay 98,3 (2008–09; renamed Saguenay Marquis)
Saguenay Fjord (2004–05; folded after 24 games)
Saguenay Paramédic (2002–04; renamed Saguenay Fjord)
Ste-Marie Poutrelles Delta (2008; folded during the season)
Sainte-Thérèse Chiefs (1997–98; became Laval Chiefs)
Saint-Gabriel Blizzard (1996–98; became Joliette Blizzard)
Saint-Georges Garaga (1998–2005; renamed Saint-Georges CRS Express)
Saint-Hyacinthe Chiefs (2008–09; folded)
Saint-Hyacinthe Cousin (2001–05; renamed Saint-Hyacinthe Cristal)
Saint-Hyacinthe Cristal (2005–06; renamed Saint-Hyacinthe Top Design)
Saint-Hyacinthe Top Design (2006–08; renamed Saint-Hyacinthe Chiefs)
Saint-Jean-sur-Richelieu Mission (2002–04; became Sorel-Tracy Mission)
Saint-Jean-sur-Richelieu Summum-Chiefs (2006–08; became Saguenay 98.3)
Saint-Laurent Dragons (1998–2001; became Verdun Dragons)
Sherbrooke Saint-François (2003–11; became Windsor Wild)
Sorel Dinosaures (1996–99; renamed Sorel Royaux)
Sorel Mission (2004–08)
Sorel Royaux (1999–2004; folded)
Sorel-Tracy GCI (2010–11)
Thetford Mines Coyotes (1996–2000; renamed Thetford Mines Prolab)
Thetford Mines Isothermic (2007–15; renamed Thetford Assurancia)
Thetford Mines Prolab (2000–07; renamed Thetford Mines Isothermic)
Trois-Rivières Blizzard (2014–17; renamed Trois-Rivières Draveurs)
Trois-Rivières Draveurs (2017–18; membership revoked)
Trois-Rivières Viking (2003–04; folded)
Valleyfield Braves (2013; became Laval Braves partway through 2013–14 season)
Vanier Voyageurs (1996–97; became Québec As and played at Val-Bélair)
Verdun Dragons (2001–05; renamed Verdun-Montréal Dragons)
Verdun-Montréal Dragons (2005–06; folded)
Waterloo 94 (1996–97; became Granby Blitz)
Windsor Lacroix (2001–03; became Sherbrooke Saint-François)
Windsor Papetiers (1996–2001; renamed Windsor Lacroix)
Windsor Wild (2011–12; became Cornwall River Kings)

Champions
The Vertdure Cup is the trophy awarded annually to champions of the LNAH. It was first awarded after the 1996–97 season, and was originally called the Futura Cup. In 2011, it was renamed the Canam Cup, and in 2014 as the Vertdure Cup.

LNAH Finals appearances by city
Note: Cities listed in yellow are currently home to an LNAH franchise.

References

External links
 Ligue Nord-Américaine de Hockey 

 
1
Ice hockey leagues in Ontario
Minor league ice hockey
Articles which contain graphical timelines
1996 establishments in Canada
Sports leagues established in 1996
Professional sports leagues in Canada